The Seattle Mariners 1997 season was their 21st season, and the team won their second American League West  with a record of  six games ahead of the runner-up Anaheim Angels. For the second straight year, they led the AL in runs scored (925) and shattered the all-time record for most home runs hit by a team in one season (set at 257 by the Baltimore Orioles the year before) with 264. Five Mariners scored at least 100 runs and six hit at least 20 home runs. In addition, the Seattle pitching staff led the league with 1,207 strikeouts.
In the postseason, the Mariners lost the ALDS to the Baltimore Orioles in 4 games.

The Mariners drew over three million in home attendance for the first time in franchise  in the penultimate full season at the Kingdome. Ken Griffey Jr. hit a franchise record 56 home runs and won the Most Valuable Player award in the American League.

Offseason
October 3, 1996: Ricky Jordan was released by the Mariners.
November 12, 1996: Jalal Leach was signed as a free agent with the Mariners.
November 15, 1996: Dave Silvestri was selected off waivers by the Mariners from the Montreal Expos.
December 21, 1996: Josías Manzanillo was signed as a free agent with the Mariners.
January 10, 1997: Brent Mayne was signed as a free agent with the Mariners.
January 22, 1997: Rob Ducey was signed as a free agent with the Mariners. 
January 24, 1997: Mike Blowers was signed as a free agent with the Mariners.
February 20, 1997: Dennis Martínez was signed as a free agent with the Mariners.
March 27, 1997: Dave Silvestri was selected off waivers by the Texas Rangers from the Mariners.
March 28, 1997: Brent Mayne was released by the Mariners.

Regular season

In 1997, Randy Johnson set an American League record for left-handers by striking out 19 batters in a 4-1 loss to the Oakland A's on June 24.
On August 8 he matched the feat by setting down 19 Chicago White Sox.
Johnson posted a 20-4 record with 291 strikeouts and an ERA of 2.28. He finished second in the Cy Young balloting to Toronto's Roger Clemens.

Opening Day starters
Jay Buhner
Joey Cora
Russ Davis
Jeff Fassero
Ken Griffey Jr.
Edgar Martínez
Alex Rodriguez
Paul Sorrento
Lee Tinsley
Dan Wilson

Season standings

Record vs. opponents

Notable transactions
April 8, 1997: Steve Decker was signed as a free agent with the Seattle Mariners.
May 24, 1997: Dennis Martínez was released by the Seattle Mariners.
July 17, 1997: Josías Manzanillo was released by the Seattle Mariners.
July 31, 1997: Heathcliff Slocumb was traded by the Boston Red Sox to the Seattle Mariners for Derek Lowe and Jason Varitek.
July 31, 1997: Paul Spoljaric was traded by the Toronto Blue Jays with Mike Timlin to the Seattle Mariners for Jose Cruz.
 August 20, 1997: Roberto Kelly was traded by the Minnesota Twins to the Seattle Mariners for players to be named later. The Seattle Mariners sent Joe Mays (October 9, 1997) and Jeromy Palki (minors) (October 9, 1997) to the Minnesota Twins to complete the trade.
September 2, 1997: Steve Decker was released by the Seattle Mariners.

Roster

Player stats

Batting

Starters by position 
Note: Pos = Position; G = Games played; AB = At bats; H = Hits; Avg. = Batting average; HR = Home runs; RBI = Runs batted in

Other batters 
Note: G = Games played; AB = At bats; H = Hits; Avg. = Batting average; HR = Home runs; RBI = Runs batted in

Pitching

Starting pitchers 
Note: G = Games pitched; IP = Innings pitched; W = Wins; L = Losses; ERA = Earned run average; SO = Strikeouts

Other pitchers 
Note: G = Games pitched; IP = Innings pitched; W = Wins; L = Losses; ERA = Earned run average; SO = Strikeouts

Relief pitchers 
Note: G = Games pitched; W = Wins; L = Losses; SV = Saves; ERA = Earned run average; SO = Strikeouts

ALDS

Game 1
October 1, Kingdome

Game 2
October 2, Kingdome

Game 3
October 4, Oriole Park at Camden Yards

Game 4
October 5, Oriole Park at Camden Yards

Awards and honors
The Mariners led the American League in home runs with 264

Farm system

References

External links
1997 Seattle Mariners at Baseball Reference
1997 Seattle Mariners team page at www.baseball-almanac.com

Seattle Mariners seasons
Seattle Mariners season
American League West champion seasons
Seattle Marin